"I'll Be Holding On" is a 1974 song by Al Downing. "I'll Be Holding On" was written by Downing, Lance Quinn, and Andrew Smith and produced by Tony Bongiovi, Meco Monardo, and Jay Ellis.

"I'll Be Holding On", went to number one for three weeks on the Billboard disco/dance chart. The single also peaked at #85 on the Billboard Hot 100 and #31 on the R&B chart.

References

1974 singles
1974 songs
1975 singles
Chess Records singles
Disco songs
Song recordings produced by Tony Bongiovi